Golog (Golok or Guoluo)  Tibetan Autonomous Prefecture is an autonomous prefecture occupying the southeastern corner of Qinghai province, People's Republic of China. Due to its special geographical location and natural environment, the entire autonomous preference has been included in the Chinese largest natural environmental protection area — the Sanjiangyuan National Park.

Geography
Golog Prefecture is located in the southeastern part of Qinghai, in the upper basin of the Yellow River. Gyaring Lake and Ngoring Lake on the western edge of the prefecture are considered to be the source of the Yellow River. However, these lakes do receive water from rivers that flow from locations even further west, in Qumarleb County of the Yushu Tibetan Autonomous Prefecture.

The lay of the land of the prefecture is largely determined by the Amne Machin mountain range (max elevation 6,282 m), which runs in the general northwest- to-southeast direction across the entire prefecture, and beyond. The existence of the ridge results in one of the great bends of the Yellow River, which first flows for several hundreds of kilometers toward the east and southeast along through the entire Golog Prefecture, along the southern side of the Amne Machin Range, until it reaches the borders of Gansu and Sichuan; it and then turns almost 180 degrees and flows toward the northwest for  through several prefectures of the northeastern Qinghai, forming a section of the northeastern border of the Golog prefecture.

Several sections  of the Sanjiangyuan ("Sources of Three Rivers") National Nature Reserve are within the prefecture.

Climate

Demographics 

According to the 2000 census,  Guoluo has 137,940 inhabitants with a population density of 1.81 inhabitants/km2.

Ethnic groups in Guoluo, 2000 census

Subdivisions
The prefecture is subdivided into six county-level divisions: six counties:

Transport
Construction for Golog Maqin Airport began in September 2012 and the airport opened on 1 July 2016.

 of new roads are expected to be built by 2015.

Further reading 
 A. Gruschke: The Cultural Monuments of Tibet’s Outer Provinces: Amdo - Volume 1. The Qinghai Part of Amdo, White Lotus Press, Bangkok 2001. 
 Tsering Shakya: The Dragon in the Land of Snows. A History of Modern Tibet Since 1947, London 1999, 
 B. Horlemann: Modernization Efforts in Golog: A Chronicle, 1970–2000 (PDF), in: Amdo Tibetans in Transition: Society and Culture in the Post-Mao Era. Edited by Toni Huber. 2: 241–67, 2002.
 Gangs Phrug. A Modern Golok Tibetan Family History. 2015. https://archive.org/details/HappyHappy_201502.
 Historical photographs of the Golok Tibetans in on Commons

References

External links 
Guoluo Tibetan Autonomous Prefecture 

Tibetan autonomous prefectures
Amdo
 
Prefecture-level divisions of Qinghai